Stève Nzigamasabo (born 10 December 1990) is a Burundian footballer who plays as a midfielder for KMC.

References

1990 births
Living people
Burundian footballers
Burundi international footballers
Vital'O F.C. players
Rangers International F.C. players
Sofapaka F.C. players
Bugesera FC players
Namungo F.C. players
Association football midfielders
Burundian expatriate footballers
Expatriate footballers in Nigeria
Burundian expatriate sportspeople in Nigeria
Expatriate footballers in Kenya
Burundian expatriate sportspeople in Kenya
Expatriate footballers in Rwanda
Burundian expatriate sportspeople in Rwanda
Expatriate footballers in Tanzania
Burundian expatriate sportspeople in Tanzania
Tanzanian Premier League players